2-Methylbut-3-yn-2-ol is the organic compound with the formula HC2C(OH)Me2 (Me = CH3).  A colorless liquid, it is classified as an alkynyl alcohol.

Preparation and use
It arises from the condensation of acetylene and acetone. The addition can be promoted with base (Favorskii reaction) or with Lewis acid catalysts.  2-Methylbut-3-yn-2-ol is produced on an industrial scale as a precursor to terpenes and terpenoids.

2-Methylbut-3-yn-2-ol also is used as a monoprotected version of acetylene.  For example, after arylation at carbon, the acetone can be removed with base:
HC2C(OH)Me2  +  ArX  +  base  →   ArC2C(OH)Me2  + [Hbase]X
ArC2C(OH)Me2   →   ArC2H  +  OCMe2
In this regard, 2-methylbut-3-yn-2-ol is used similarly to trimethylsilylacetylene.

References

Alkynols
Tertiary alcohols